The 6th constituency of the Haute-Savoie (French: Sixième circonscription de la Haute-Savoie) is a French legislative constituency in the Haute-Savoie département. Like the other 576 French constituencies, it elects one MP using a two round electoral system.

Description

The 6th constituency of Haute-Savoie covers the south east of the department the area is mountainous including Mont-Blanc and Chamonix. The seat was only created for the 2012 elections and in first election joined all the other constituencies in Haute-Savoie in electing a candidate from the centre right UMP. However, in 2017 the seat swung to Emmanuel Macron's centrist En Marche! party.

Assembly members

Election results

2022

 
 
 
 
 
 
|-
| colspan="8" bgcolor="#E9E9E9"|
|-
 
 

 
 
 
 
 * Lagarde ran as a dissident EELV candidate without the support of the NUPES alliance, of which EELV is a member. The 2017 EELV result is included with the NUPES alliance for swing calculations.

2017

 
 
 
 
 
 
|-
| colspan="8" bgcolor="#E9E9E9"|
|-

2012

 
 
 
 
 
 
 
 
|-
| colspan="8" bgcolor="#E9E9E9"|
|-

References

6